Pseudobotrys is a genus of trees and shrubs in the family Cardiopteridaceae described as a genus in 1912.

The entire genus is endemic to New Guinea.

Species
 Pseudobotrys cauliflora (Pulle) Sleumer 1940
 Pseudobotrys dorae Moeser 1912

References 

Cardiopteridaceae
Asterid genera
Endemic flora of New Guinea